Simon Marlow is a British computer programmer, author, and co-developer of the Glasgow Haskell Compiler (GHC). He and Simon Peyton Jones won the SIGPLAN Programming Languages Software Award in 2011 for their work on GHC. Marlow's book Parallel and Concurrent Programming in Haskell was published in August 2013.

Formerly of Microsoft Research, Marlow has worked at Facebook since March 2013. The "noted Haskell guru" is part of the team behind Facebook's open source Haxl project, a Haskell library that simplifies access to remote data.

References

British computer scientists
Facebook employees
Living people
Year of birth missing (living people)